The R. K. Cho Economics Prize is awarded by Yonsei University in Seoul, South Korea to academics in the field of economics who have contributed to the development of scholarship and education. As of 2018, the prize includes a plaque, a medal, and a monetary award of ₩100 million.

History
The prize was established in 2007 with an endowment from R. K. Cho, the president of Samryoong Co. and an alumnus of Yonsei University's economics department. Cho was motivated to create the award after seeing the results of his prior humanities-focused donations to Yonsei University, and hoped the prize could help to connect students of his alma mater and famous South Korean economists overseas. Originally awarded only to South Korean citizens, in 2015 the prize was opened to foreign scholars as well. Due to the COVID-19 pandemic, no recipient was selected in 2021, and the award ceremony for the twelfth recipient (Valerie Ramey in 2020) was delayed until September 2022 when it could be held jointly with the ceremony for the thirteenth recipient (Yuriy Gorodnichenko).

Recipients
2008: Yeon-Koo Che of Columbia University
2009: Hyun-Song Shin of Princeton University for work in financial crises and financial stability
2010: Joon Y. Park of Indiana University
2011: Jinyong Hahn of the University of California, Los Angeles
2012: In-koo Cho of the University of Illinois
2013: Chang Yongsung of Yonsei University
2014: Choi Jae-pil of Yonsei University
2015: Richard Rogerson of Princeton University
2016: Quang Vuong of New York University, for work in econometrics
2017: Michihiro Kandori of the University of Tokyo, for "contributions to the theory of social norms, convention, and cooperation"
2018: Hyungsik Roger Moon of the University of Southern California, for theoretical works on panel data
2020: Valerie Ramey of the University of California, San Diego, for work on the macroneconomic effects of fiscal expenditure
2022: Yuriy Gorodnichenko of the University of California, Berkeley, for work on inflation expectation surveys

See also
List of economics awards

References

External links
  
Page for the R. K. Cho Economics Prize on the website of Yonsei University's Department of Economics 

2007 establishments in South Korea
Awards established in 2007
Economics awards
South Korean awards
Yonsei University